Yuriy Oliynyk (1 December 193113 September 2021) was a Ukrainian composer, concert pianist, and professor of music who lived and worked in the United States.

Biography
Yuriy Oliynyk was born in Ternopil, Ukraine. He was the son of a Ukrainian lawyer and started studying piano at the age of seven. During World War II, his family was forced to flee from their home to Austria, and later Germany.

In 1950, Oliynyk emigrated to the United States. He received a degree in piano as a Bachelor of Music from the Cleveland Institute of Music and a degree in musicology as a Master of Arts from the Case Western Reserve University.

Yuriy Oliynyk was a trained music teacher;  he worked at the American River College in Sacramento, California. He was the first president of the Ukrainian Heritage Club of Northern California.

Works
Oliynyk has composed four concertos for bandura and orchestra, a piano concerto and other pieces for piano, bandura, and voice. Together with his wife Ola Herasymenko, he has performed his works, along with other works of famous classical composers, across the US and Europe. His music has been performed by other musicians and has been recorded onto CDs.

In October 2000 a World Premiere of Oliynyk's piano concerto took place in Europe, with Oksana Rapita as soloist.

External links
Home page of Yuriy and Ola Oliynyk
Ukrainian Cultural Performance
Ukrainian Heritage Club of Northern California
 Obituary

Ukrainian composers
Ukrainian pianists
Case Western Reserve University alumni
American River College faculty
Cleveland Institute of Music alumni
Bandurists
Ukrainian emigrants to the United States
Ukrainian music educators
Musicians from Ternopil
1931 births
21st-century pianists
Recipients of the Honorary Diploma of the Cabinet of Ministers of Ukraine